Gnathochromis permaxillaris is a species of African fish in the family Cichlidae. It is endemic to relatively deep waters in Lake Tanganyika in the countries of Burundi, the Democratic Republic of the Congo, Tanzania, and Zambia. It is widespread in the lake, but occurs in low densities.

It feeds on zooplankton and will shift sand, similar to the distantly related Geophagus eartheaters of South America. Like many other Tanganyika cichlids, it is a mouthbrooder and occasionally seen in the aquarium trade.

References

Gnathochromis
Fish described in 1936
Taxonomy articles created by Polbot